The 1951 Kentucky Wildcats football team represented the University of Kentucky during the 1951 college football season. The Wildcats scored 314 points while allowing 121 points.  Ranked #6 in the AP Poll at the beginning of the season, the team finished the season with a victory in the 1952 Cotton Bowl Classic and a #15 AP ranking.

Schedule

Team players drafted into the NFL

Awards and honors
Ray Correll, Guard, Cotton Bowl Classic co-Most Valuable Player
Emery Clark, Halfback, Cotton Bowl Classic co-Most Valuable Player
Babe Parilli, Quarterback, All-America selection
Babe Parilli, Cotton Bowl Classic co-Most Valuable Player
Doug Moseley, Center, All-America selection

References

Kentucky
Kentucky Wildcats football seasons
Cotton Bowl Classic champion seasons
Kentucky Wildcats football